The Mayor of Waitaki officiates over the Waitaki District of New Zealand's South Island. The district has been administered by a district council since 1989.

Gary Kircher is the current mayor of Waitaki. He has been mayor since 2013.

List of mayors

References

Waitaki
Waitaki District
Waitaki
Mayors of places in Canterbury, New Zealand
Mayors of places in Otago